Photographs is the fourth album by Patrick Sky, released in 1969.

Track listing
All tracks composed by Patrick Sky; except where indicated

Side One
 "She" – 2:25 
 "Dirge to Love Gone By" – 3:08 
 "I Like to Sleep Late in the Morning" (David Blue) – 2:20
 "Circe" – 3:04 
 "Pinball Machine" (Lonnie Irving) – 3:51

Side Two
 "Photographs" – 2:30 
 "Peter Pan" – 2:10 
 "Beggar's Riddle" – 3:18 
 "The Greater Manhattan Love Song" (Gary White) – 2:02
 "Who Am I" – 3:03

Personnel
David Bromberg - lead guitar
 Produced and arranged by Barry Kornfeld
 except "Photographs" arranged by Bob Dorough.
 Director of Engineering: Val Valentin
 Art Direction: Sid Maurer
 Cover Photo: Robert J. Campbell 
 Cover Design: Michael Mendel

Patrick Sky albums
Verve Forecast Records albums
1969 albums